Kalinówka Kościelna  is a village in the administrative district of Gmina Knyszyn, within Mońki County, Podlaskie Voivodeship, in north-eastern Poland.

The village has a population of 205.

The parish was founded and the church built in 1511 by Mikołaj II Radziwiłł, voivode of Vilnius. Its funding was increased by King Sigismund II Augustus. The church in Kalinówka was under the patronage of Saint Anne. A new church was built, perhaps around the middle of the 16th century, and the old one was transported to Brzozowa, which was a branch of the Kalinówka church. On 17 August 1761 the church in Kalinówka burned down, along with the archive and rectory. It was rebuilt anew of larch wood, thanks to the efforts of Rev. Adam Świerzbiński, pastor in Kalinówka, canon of Inflanty. The construction undoubtedly lasted several years and was finished in 1776. This church was consecrated on 5 October 1777 by Brześć (of Łuck diocese) suffragan bishop Jan Szyjkowski. This church has survived to modern times and continues to serve the faithful.
 
At that same time, that is, around 1774, a new rectory was built as well as other pastoral buildings, including a storeroom that has survived to our day and is registered as a monument [or relic]. The rectory from that time, on the other hand, was taken apart after a new one was built of brick and stone, in the days of pastor Rev. Antoni Kruk in the 1980s.

References

Villages in Mońki County
Podlachian Voivodeship
Grodno Governorate
Białystok Voivodeship (1919–1939)
Belastok Region